Polly Ann Riley (August 27, 1926 – March 13, 2002) was an American amateur golfer.

Riley won over 100 tournaments in her career. Although she remained an amateur throughout her career, she won the first LPGA Tour event, the 1950 Tampa Open.

Riley was runner-up in the 1953 U.S. Women's Amateur to Mary Lena Faulk. She played on the U.S. Curtis Cup teams six times (1948, 1950, 1952, 1954, 1956, 1958) and was the captain in 1962.

She mistook golfer Ann Gregory for a maid at the Women's Amateur in Williamstown, Massachusetts in 1963.

Tournament wins
this list is incomplete
1947 Women's Trans-Mississippi Amateur
1948 Women's Southern Amateur, Women's Trans-Mississippi Amateur, Women's Texas Open
1950 Women's Southern Amateur, Women's Western Amateur, Tampa Open (LPGA Tour)
1951 Women's Southern Amateur
1952 Women's Western Amateur
1953 Women's Southern Amateur
1954 Women's Southern Amateur
1955 Women's Trans-Mississippi Amateur, Women's Texas Open
1961 Women's Southern Amateur

Team appearances
Amateur
Curtis Cup (representing the United States): 1948 (winners), 1950 (winners), 1952, 1954 (winners), 1956, 1958 (tie), 1962 (non-playing captain, winners)

References

American female golfers
Amateur golfers
Golfers from San Antonio
Sportspeople from Fort Worth, Texas
Deaths from cancer in Texas
1926 births
2002 deaths
20th-century American women